Count  was a Japanese samurai of the late Edo period who served as the last daimyō of Yonezawa han in Dewa Province. In the Meiji era he became a government official and briefly served as governor of Okinawa Prefecture.

Biography 
A distant relative of the famed Uesugi Kenshin, Mochinori was born in 1844. Mochinori's father Narinori took part in the movements of the northern domains which culminated in the creation of the Ōuetsu Reppan Dōmei during the Boshin War. After the end of the war, Narinori was made to retire, and Mochinori became lord of Yonezawa in his place. In his last act as lord, Mochinori distributed around 100,000 ryō of gold coins from the domain's treasury to the retainers.

Following the war, in 1871, he moved to Tokyo, and then went abroad to England to study. Later, in May 1881, he became the second governor of Okinawa Prefecture. Upon becoming governor, he traveled the prefecture and oversaw a survey of conditions and lifestyle in the islands. The resulting document remains today a valuable resource for understanding the Okinawa of that time. He petitioned the Meiji government for permission and aid to effect a number of reforms, but was denied. However, under Mochinori's administration, a great many elementary schools were founded, along with a system by which the prefectural government funded students to study in Tokyo, and variety of other educational programs.

He was replaced as governor of Okinawa in 1883, becoming a member of the Genrōin (Council of Elders in the central Tokyo-based government), and in 1884 he became a count (伯爵 hakushaku). Toward the end of his life, he also received a promotion to senior 2nd court rank (正二位 shō-ni-i). His tenure as governor of Okinawa was short, a result, it is said, of Tokyo's disapproval of the extent of his reform programs in the prefecture at a time when there remained sovereignty disputes with China over the islands. Even after leaving this office, however, he continued to make contributions towards the welfare and education of Okinawan students in Japan.

Mochinori moved to Yonezawa in 1896, and died there in 1919.

Kuninori Uesugi, the modern-day astronomer, is Mochinori's great-grandson.

Notes

References 
 ---- (1996). Okinawa rekishi jinmei jiten (沖縄歴史人名事典, "Encyclopedia of People of Okinawan History"). Naha: Okinawa Bunka-sha.
 Kerr, George H. (2000). Okinawa: the History of an Island People. (revised ed.) Boston: Tuttle Publishing.

Further reading 
 Asano Gengo 浅野源吾. Yonezawa-han shi 米沢藩史. Tokyo: Tōyō Shoin 東洋書院, Shōwa 50 (1975)
 Yonezawa-han Boshin monjo 米澤藩戊辰文書. Edited by Nihon Shiseki Kyōkai 日本史籍協會編. Tokyo: Tokyo Daigaku Shuppankai 東京大學出版會, Shōwa 42 (1967)

External links 
 Biographical Information

|-

1844 births
1919 deaths
Kazoku
Meiji Restoration
Members of the House of Peers (Japan)
Governors of Okinawa Prefecture
Uesugi clan
Tozama daimyo
Japanese expatriates in the United Kingdom